Bernie Wijesekara (1930 – 1 October 2014) was a senior sports journalist in Sri Lanka.

He received his secondary school education at Nalanda College in Colombo (largest city of Sri Lanka) before joining the Times of Ceylon as a junior sports journalist. Wijesekara then worked for the Daily News and subsequently for the Sunday Observer.

Wijesekara was honoured with a 'Life time Service award for Cricket' journalism by Dialog Sri Lanka awards ceremony.

He covered the inaugural (Prudential) Cricket World Cup held in England in 1975. He was also a Justice of the Peace.

References

Demise of Senior Journalist Bernie Wijesekara
Bernie Wijesekara passes away
 Beloved Bernie no more
 Demise of Senior Journalist Bernie Wijesekara
 Kandy Sports Round up

Sinhalese journalists
1930 births
2014 deaths
Alumni of Nalanda College, Colombo
Sri Lankan journalists